The 1986 Vermont gubernatorial election took place on November 4, 1986. Incumbent Democrat Madeleine Kunin ran successfully for re-election to a second term as Governor of Vermont, defeating Republican candidate Peter Plympton Smith and independent candidate Bernie Sanders. Since no candidate won a majority of the popular vote, Kunin was elected by the Vermont General Assembly per the state constitution.

Democratic primary

Results

Republican primary

Results

Liberty Union primary

Results

General election

Candidates 
Madeleine M. Kunin (D), incumbent Governor of Vermont
Peter Plympton Smith (R), Lieutenant Governor of Vermont
Bernie Sanders (I), Mayor of Burlington, Vermont
Richard F. Gottlieb (LU)

Results

After no candidate received a majority of the vote, the Vermont Legislature, consisting of 150 representatives and 30 senators, voted to decide the winner, per the state constitution.

References

Vermont
1986
Gubernatorial
Bernie Sanders